

The DFW R.I, (company designation DFW T26), was a prototype German bomber aircraft of World War I.

Development
Developed as a private venture by DFW, it was a large biplane of conventional configuration with four engines mounted inside the fuselage, powering propellers on the wings via transmission shafts - two mounted tractor-fashion on the leading edge of the upper wing, and two mounted pusher-fashion on the trailing edge of the lower wing. The DFW R.I was unique, among the Riesenflugzeuge with internally mounted engines, in that each engine drove a separate propeller and was not connected to the other engines or propellers.

After factory tests proved promising, military acceptance trials commenced on 19 October 1916 and led to the aircraft being purchased for the Luftstreitkräfte. Soon thereafter trouble set in, with crankshafts repeatedly failing. This was attributed mostly to the engine design, but new engine mountings and universal joints for each end of the drive shafts were fitted to mitigate the problem, along with extended wings and other improvements.

Operational history
Following these modifications, R.I (R 11/15) was deployed on the Eastern front with Rfa 500 at Alt-Auz, April 1917 to September 1917, from whence it raided Riga during the summer of 1917. On its second combat mission, the R.I crashed due to the failure of two engines, and was destroyed.

Specifications (DFW R.I (second version))

See also

References

Further reading
 The German Giants, The Story of the R-planes 1914-1919, G.W. Haddow & Peter M. Grosz, Putnam & Company Limited, 42 Great Russell Street, London,  First Published July 1962

External links
 "The German D.F.W. Commercial Four-Engined Biplane" Flight 25 September 1919, vol. XI, no. 39, pp. 1274–78. The R.I is only mentioned on p. 1274 and is not illustrated.

1910s German bomber aircraft
R.I
Four-engined push-pull aircraft
Mid-engined aircraft
Biplanes
Aircraft first flown in 1916